In differential calculus, the domain-straightening theorem states that, given a vector field  on a manifold, there exist local coordinates  such that  in a neighborhood of a point where  is nonzero. The theorem is also known as straightening out of a vector field.

The Frobenius theorem in differential geometry can be considered as a higher-dimensional generalization of this theorem.

Proof 
Let . By linear change of coordinates, we can assume  Let  be the solution of the initial value problem  and let

 (and thus ) is smooth by smooth dependence on initial conditions in ordinary differential equations. It follows that
,
Finally, since , we have:  and so 
as required.

References 

Theorem B.7 in Camille Laurent-Gengoux, Anne Pichereau, Pol Vanhaecke. Poisson Structures, Springer, 2013.

Differential calculus